Associazione Sportiva Roma crashed down to earth following its previous two remarkable seasons, where it had won Serie A in 2000–01 and finished a close second in 2001–02. Despite the acquisition of Pep Guardiola as central midfielder, he did not apparently fit into Fabio Capello's first-team plans. The squad was essentially the same as the year before, and Guardiola's absence from the starting XI spoke volumes about the reputation of the Roma players at the time. However, things began to go against Roma following its tense competition in Serie A with Juventus. Suspecting things were amiss, both chairman Franco Sensi and manager Capello publicly condemned the judgements, and given the Calciopoli scandal in 2006, chances are they had a point.

Due to all the 'misfortune' with decisions, Roma's season soon descended into complete darkness, the only highlight of the season being the qualification for the Coppa Italia final, which they lost to Milan. In the league, only a strong final third of the season saved eighth place, with only Francesco Totti reaching his normal level.

Players

Squad information
Last updated on 31 May 2003
Appearances include league matches only

Transfers

Winter

Competitions

Overall

Last updated: 31 May 2003

Serie A

League table

Results summary

Results by round

Matches

Coppa Italia

Round of 16

Quarter-finals

Semi-finals

Final

UEFA Champions League

Group stage

Second group stage

Statistics

Appearances and goals

|-
! colspan=14 style="background:#B21B1C; color:#FFD700; text-align:center"| Players transferred out during the season

Goalscorers

Last updated: 31 May 2003

Clean sheets

Last updated: 31 May 2003

Disciplinary record

Last updated:

References

A.S. Roma seasons
Roma